Peter Bonnington (born 12 February 1975), often known as Bono, is a British Formula One engineer. He is currently the senior race engineer for Lewis Hamilton at the Mercedes AMG Petronas Motorsport Formula One team.

Career
Bonnington started his Formula 1 career as a data engineer with Jordan Grand Prix in the early 2000s. During his time with the Silverstone team he worked alongside the likes of Giorgio Pantano and Timo Glock. He then joined the Honda team as an understudy to long time race engineer Andrew Shovlin and therefore became Jenson Button’s performance engineer. Bonnington remained with the team as it transitioned into Brawn GP, guiding Button to his maiden World Championship in 2009.

After a stint as Michael Schumacher's performance engineer at Mercedes, he became his race engineer replacing the departing Mark Slade in September 2011. After Schumacher left the Brackley team at the end of 2012, Bonnington became senior race engineer for Lewis Hamilton, a position he retains to this day.

In his current role as senior race engineer, he is responsible for all trackside communications to the driver and the set up of the Formula One car. During his time in this position, he has engineered Hamilton to six of his seven world championships and is widely regarded as being one of the most skilled race engineers in Formula One.

Notes

References

Living people
1965 births
21st-century British engineers
Formula One engineers
British motorsport people
Mercedes-Benz in Formula One